Luitpold of Bavaria  may refer to:
 Luitpold, Prince Regent of Bavaria (1821–1912)
 Prince Luitpold of Bavaria (b. 1951)